Trioceros serratus is a species of chameleon found in Cameroon.

References

Trioceros
Reptiles described in 1922
Taxa named by Robert Mertens
Reptiles of Cameroon